David Ian Perrett FBA FRSE (born 11 April 1954)  is a professor of psychology at the University of St Andrews in Scotland, where he leads the Perception Lab. The main focus in his team's research is on face perception, including facial cues to health, effects of physiological conditions on facial appearance, and facial preferences in social settings such as trust games and mate choice. He has published over 400 peer-reviewed articles, many of which appearing in leading scientific journals such as the Proceedings of the Royal Society of London Series B—Biological Sciences, Psychological Science, and Nature.

Perrett received the British Psychological Society President's Award for Distinguished Contributions to Psychological Knowledge in 2000, the Golden Brain Award of Minerva Foundation in 2002, the Experimental Psychology Society Mid-Career prize (2008), and a British Academy Wolfson Research Professorship (2009–2012).

Perrett received a BSc in psychology from the University of St Andrews in 1976. Perrett received a DPhil in psychology from Oxford University in 1981, under Edmund Rolls.

References

Further reading
"Face It: Average Just Isn't Beautiful", Chicago Sun-Times, 17 March 1994.
"Average Faces Get Low Beauty Rating", San Jose Mercury News, 17 March 1994.
"Why Boyzone has them swooning", New Scientist, 29 August 1998.
"A bit on the side", New Scientist, 26 June 1999.
"Playing the Mating Game: When will a woman go for the hunk or the hubby?", Newsweek, 5 July 1999.
"Top Brass: A voyage of discovery around the human mind; The 10 leading psychologists in Britain, as chosen by their peers", The Independent, 14 October 2001.
"Like father like husband", New Scientist, 2 February 2002.

External links 
 Perception Lab

Scottish psychologists
Evolutionary psychologists
Living people
1954 births
Fellows of the Royal Society of Edinburgh
Fellows of the British Academy